Kemi Sámi was a Sámi language that was originally spoken in the southernmost district of Finnish Lapland as far south as the Sámi siidas around Kuusamo.

A complex of local variants which had a distinct identity from other Sámi dialects, but existed in a linguistic continuum between Inari Sámi and Skolt Sámi (some Kemi groups sounded more like Inari, and some more like Skolt, due to geographic proximity).

Extinct now for over 100 years, few written examples of Kemi Sámi survive. Johannes Schefferus's Lapponia from 1673 contains two yoik poems by the Kemi Sámi Olof (Mattsson) Sirma, "Guldnasas" and "Moarsi favrrot". A short vocabulary was written by the Finnish priest Jacob Fellman in 1829 after he visited the villages of Salla (Kuolajärvi until 1936) and Sompio.

Sample texts 
The following translation of the Lord's Prayer still survives:

Lord's Prayer, village of Sompio (Sodankylä)

This is Sirma's first poem, "Guldnasas", a Sámi love story which he sang to spur on his reindeer so that they will run faster:

This is Sirma's second poem, "Moarsi favrrot", the one he sang when he was far away from his love to prize her beauty.

See also
Sámi people
Sámi languages
Akkala Sámi language
Skolt Sámi language
Inari Sámi language
Kildin Sámi language
Lapponia (book)
Lapland (region)
Colonialism
Orajärvi
Extinct language

References

Languages of Finland
Sámi in Finland
Eastern Sámi languages
Extinct languages of Europe
Languages extinct in the 20th century